The Basketball Tournament 2019 was the sixth edition of The Basketball Tournament (TBT), a 5-on-5, single elimination basketball tournament broadcast by the ESPN family of networks. The tournament, involving 64 teams, started on July 19 and continued through the championship game on August 6 at Wintrust Arena in Chicago. The winner of the final, Carmen's Crew, received a $2 million prize.

Format 
The tournament began with a field of 64 teams, organized into eight regions of 8 teams, all of which were seeded. In a first for TBT, each regional was hosted by a competing team, with the winner of each regional receiving a prize equal to 25% of that region's ticket proceeds. Host teams were announced on January 29, 2019, ahead of the start of the open entry period on March 1. The full bracket was announced on June 11.

Dunk contest
The Puma Posterize Dunk Contest was held during the quarterfinals, on August 2. The contest "features players attempting to dunk over one another." The contest and $40,000 top prize was won by William Coleman of Bluff City, a team of Memphis Tigers alumni.

Venues
The Basketball Tournament 2019 was staged in nine locations. Red dots mark regional locations and the green dot marks the championship location. The Wichita Regional, held near McConnell Air Force Base, was branded as "The Wichita Regional Presented by Air Force Reserve", through sponsorship by the Air Force Reserve.

Alumni teams
Multiple teams in the tournament were comprised mostly or exclusively of alumni of a particular school, program, or a group of closely related schools. These teams are listed below.

Schedule
Regional games were televised on ESPN or ESPN2, or streamed on ESPN3; the quarterfinals were televised on ESPN, ESPN2, or ESPNU; the semifinals and final were televised on ESPN. Each regional winner received 25% of the ticket sales in their region as a prize.

Bracket
All times Eastern.

Richmond Regional – Siegel Center, Richmond, VA

Richmond Regional Final

Lexington Regional – Frederick Douglass HS, Lexington, KY

Lexington Regional Final

Salt Lake Regional – Maverik Center, West Valley City, UT

Salt Lake Regional Final

Columbus Regional – Capital University Performance Arena, Bexley, OH

Columbus Regional Final

Syracuse Regional – SRC Arena, Onondaga Community College, Syracuse, NY

Syracuse Regional Final

Greensboro Regional – Greensboro Coliseum Fieldhouse, Greensboro, NC

Greensboro Regional Final

Wichita Regional – Charles Koch Arena, Wichita, KS

Wichita Regional Final

Memphis Regional – Elma Roane Fieldhouse, Memphis, TN

Memphis Regional Final

Championship – Wintrust Arena, Chicago, IL

Source:

Semifinals

Championship

Winning roster 

Source:

Awards

Source:

References

Further reading

External links
 
 2019 Game Schedule, Results, Stats
 2019 TBT Semi-Finals - #1 Overseas Elite vs #1 Carmen's Crew via YouTube
 2019 TBT Semi-Finals - #1 Team Hines vs #1 Golden Eagles via YouTube
 2019 TBT Championship - #1 Golden Eagles vs #1 Carmen's Crew via YouTube

The Basketball Tournament
2019–20 in American basketball
July 2019 sports events in the United States
August 2019 sports events in the United States
Basketball competitions in Chicago